Ceratocombus vagans is a species of litter bug in the family Ceratocombidae. It is found in Central America and North America.

References

Ceratocombidae
Articles created by Qbugbot
Insects described in 1925